Mogadishu Stadium (Somali: Garoonka Muqdisho) is a stadium in Mogadishu, Somalia. The stadium has been completely rebuilt and artificial turf was laid on 27 March 2020.

History

The facility was constructed in 1977 during the Siad Barre administration, with the assistance of Chinese engineers. Although Mogadishu Stadium was mainly used for hosting sporting activities, presidential addresses and political rallies were also held there.

In 1987, the popular singer Magool staged the famous "Mogadishu and Magool" concert at basketball hall (adjacent to football stadium) which is part of this wide sports facility/village. It was among the largest such musical events held at the time, with thousands of people in attendance.

Following the start of the civil war in the early 1990s, the stadium was used as a base by various armed factions. A few football matches were from that period intermittently staged, but the facility remained under the control of militants.

In 2006, FIFA financed the installation of a new artificial pitch at the Mogadishu Stadium. However, the venue along with other local facilities gradually incurred infrastructural damage.

When the Al-Shabaab insurgent group laid siege to much of Mogadishu and other southern areas in 2008, it prohibited sporting activities. In August 2011, during the 2010's Battle of Mogadishu, the Somali National Army (SNA) backed by AMISOM troops recaptured the capital and stadium from the militants.

In 2013, the newly established Federal Government of Somalia began renovating the stadium in conjunction with Chinese officials.

By 2015, the artificial turf had been refurbished. The stadium also began again serving as one of the main sporting venues in the capital for Somali League football matches.

Renovations

In September 2013, the Somali federal government and its Chinese counterpart signed an official bilateral cooperation agreement in Mogadishu as part of a five-year national recovery plan in Somalia. Under the terms of the accord, the Chinese authorities were slated to reconstruct several major infrastructural landmarks in the Somali capital and elsewhere, including the Mogadishu Stadium..The renovation was completed in 2020 and it hosted the sixtieth anniversary of independence on 1st of July 2020.

Capacity and facilities
Mogadishu Stadium has a capacity of 65,000 spectators. It features a tournament ground, as well as grounds for track and field, football, basketball, volleyball and tennis.

See also
 List of association football stadiums by capacity

Notes

References
Daily report: People's Republic of China, Issues 53-61, (National Technical Information Service: 1986)

Football venues in Somalia
Athletics (track and field) venues in Somalia
Somalia

Football venues in Mogadishu